Richárd Kozma (born 1 October 1994 in Nyíregyháza) is a Hungarian football player who currently plays for Budapest Honvéd FC.

Club statistics

Updated to games played as of 4 December 2013.

References
MLSZ

1994 births
Living people
People from Nyíregyháza
Hungarian footballers
Association football midfielders
Budapest Honvéd FC players
Nemzeti Bajnokság I players
Sportspeople from Szabolcs-Szatmár-Bereg County